The Flower Girl is a North Korean revolutionary genre theatrical performance, which was written by the country's sole President Kim Il-sung according to official North Korean sources. The performance is considered one of the "Five Great Revolutionary Operas", a group of classical, revolution-themed opera repertoires well received within North Korea. It was also made into a novel. A film adaption of the opera starring Hong Yong-hee was made in 1972.

Plot
The story is set during the 1930s, and is based on the anti-Japanese guerrilla movement during the period of Japanese occupation in Korea. A poor, rural girl, around whom the plot is centred, picks flowers on the mountain every day to sell at the market, in order to care for her ill mother. Additionally, she has a blind sister, and her father is deceased. Her mother is in debt to the landlord, and is bankrupt and unable to purchase food. The landlord's subordinates frequently harass the girl and call for her to work for them, which her mother refuses. The girl then finds her blind sister attempting to earn money by singing on the street, to her anger.

Eventually, she collects enough money to purchase medicine for her ill mother, but by the time she returns, her mother has already died. The landlord's wife becomes very sick, and suspects that the flower girl's blind sister is possessed by the spirit of her deceased mother, and so arranges for her to be frozen to death in the snow. When the flower girl returns home and asks where her sister has gone, the landlord's subordinates chain her up. At this moment, her brother, who has joined the Revolutionary Army, returns home to visit family when he realises that the flower girl has been locked up, and so organises a group of villagers to overthrow the landlord.

Creation
The Flower Girl is based on a play written by Kim Il-sung in the 1930s while he was imprisoned by the Japanese, in Jilin. The first section of his 1992 memoir With the Century, entitled "Anti-Japanese Revolution", notes that:

There was a time during our country's independence movement where we held on to our vision to build an "ideal village" concept... At the time, we adopted the Korean students in Jilin to teach village people to sing a large variety of revolutionary songs, such as the Red Flag Song and Revolution Song. In Wujiazi we formed a performance group based at Samsong school led by Kye Yong-chun. It was during this time that I was completing the script for The Flower Girl, which I had started whilst I was in Jilin City. Upon finishing the script, production of the opera began, and we staged the opera in the Samsong school hall on the 13th anniversary of the October Revolution. For many years after liberation, the opera hadn't been performed since, until it was improved and adapted for film, and re-written as a novel, under the guidance of the Organising Secretary (Kim Jong-il) and released in the early 1970s.

Although it is commonly stated that Kim Il-sung was the sole author of the production, many critics in China cast doubts over the reliability of the claim, and suggest that other North Korean writers may have also had some form of interaction in the opera's production.

The first official premiere of the opera production was held on November 30, 1972, in Pyongyang, where it was hailed as a great success.

According to official North Korean reports, in April 1968, Kim Jong-il suggested that another revolutionary opera, Sea of Blood, be adapted into a movie. Since then, other works have also been adapted into movies "under his guidance", with The Flower Girl also being adapted. The opera was intended to promote the communist ideology, by incorporating themes such as the class struggle against the bourgeois; such themes were similarly maintained in the film.

In April 1972, the film adaptation was officially launched. The film was directed by Choe Ik-kyu and the script was written by Pak Hak; Paekdu-san Group was responsible for the production of the film, which was filmed in color.

Reception
According to Paul Fischer, the author of A Kim Jong-Il Production, "it is almost impossible to exaggerate" the importance of The Flower Girl to North Korea's cultural history. The film was immensely popular both domestically and abroad, particularly in China. It was the first North Korean film to win an international film award, at the 18th Karlovy Vary International Film Festival in 1972, and remained the only one until the 1980s.

The opera and its film adaptation were both well received in the People's Republic of China when they were introduced there since September 9, 1972, the day both premiered, predominantly during the closing period of the Cultural Revolution and the beginning of the era of Deng Xiaoping's rule, where the production was known by the name of The Flower-selling Girl. A number of theatrical tours were made in China, which were performed in 1973, 1998, 2002 and 2008. In 2009, Chinese Premier Wen Jiabao was received by Hong Yong-hee during his visit to North Korea. The entire translation process for The Flower Girl took only seven days. Although the dialogue was dubbed in Mandarin Chinese, song lyrics remained in Korean. As the film was played in Chinese cinemas during the period of the Cultural Revolution, the movie became immensely popular not just due to its proletarian revolution-based content but also since it was set in the 1930s - the same era as the beginning of the Japanese-held state of Manchukuo and during the years of the suffering of many Koreans in China under Japanese rule in the peninsula, to the point where theaters even adopted a 24-hour screening cycle because of high ticket sales.

As of 2008, the opera has been performed over 1,400 times in North Korea and more than 40 other countries, mostly Eastern Bloc states; other countries include France, Italy, Germany, Algeria and Japan. The title of the opera and film was known as Blomsterflickan in Sweden, Das Blumenmädchen in the German Democratic Republic, Kvetinárka in Czechoslovakia, and Kwiaciarka in Poland.

In South Korea, the film was deemed as communist propaganda and a symbol of the enemy, and screening was banned; police were often mobilised when university students were found playing the film on campus, and the students were often accused of being sympathetic with the North. In 1998, the Supreme Court of Korea ruled that The Flower Girl and six other North Korean films were "not favouring anti-ROK sentiments" in regards to national security laws.

The film forged Hong Yong-hee into a film icon. She is depicted on the North Korean one won banknote, in her role as the flower girl. The film made Choe Ik-kyu, the director, a confidant of Kim Jong-il.

Philately 
On April 30, 1974, the DPRK issued four postage stamps with scenes from the Flower Girl revolutionary opera and a miniature sheet, featuring the Flower Girl character herself with flowers.

See also

Sea of Blood
List of North Korean operas
Culture of North Korea
North Korean literature

Footnotes

References

Works cited

Further reading
이종석 (1997년). 《조선로동당연구》. 서울: 역사비평사, 54쪽.

External links

Film information from nordkorea-info.de 
Theme song (MP3) performed by Pochonbo Electronic Ensemble on Naenara

North Korean drama films
1972 films
1972 operas
1970s Korean-language films
Korean-language operas
Opera in North Korea
Operas set in the 20th century
Operas
Films set in Korea under Japanese rule
Films about the Korean People's Army
Films about the Korean independence movement